Ryan Bradley (born October 26, 1975) is a former Major League Baseball pitcher. He bats and throws right-handed.  

Bradley was drafted by the New York Yankees in the 1st round of the 1997 Major League Baseball Draft, he was drafted 40th overall. He had a 2–1 record in 5 games, with a 5.86 ERA.

He attended Arizona State University.

External links

1975 births
Living people
Arizona State Sun Devils baseball players
Baseball players from California
Major League Baseball pitchers
New York Yankees players
People from Covina, California
Carolina Mudcats players
Columbus Clippers players
Norwich Navigators players
Oneonta Yankees players
Tampa Yankees players